The 2022 Austin FC season was the club's second season in Major League Soccer, the top flight of soccer in the United States. Austin FC played in the Western Conference of Major League Soccer.

Due to the 2022 FIFA World Cup, play began February 26, 2022, about a month earlier than normal, and concluded October 9, 2022. Outside of MLS, Austin FC competed in the USSF's Lamar Hunt U.S. Open Cup for the first time in its history, which they lost in the Round of 32 to San Antonio FC 2-1 after extra time. The Verde and Black won the Copa Tejas in a 1-1 draw at FC Dallas on July 16, their first trophy in franchise history.

Sebastian Driussi became the club's first MLS All-Star. He became the first player to reach multiple goal milestones for the club, being the first player to score 10, 20, 25, and 30 career goals on April 16, August 6, August 31, and October 23 respectively. He also became the first Austin FC player to score 20 goals in a season on August 31. On September 14, Moussa Djitte came off the bench and scored the club's first ever hat trick in a playoff clinching victory against Real Salt Lake.

Austin FC improved from their 9W-4D-21L campaign in 2021 with a 3-2 comeback win against the Colorado Rapids on July 4 and finished 16W-8D-10L in the regular season. They won their first ever playoff game in penalties against Real Salt Lake and lost to LAFC in the Western Conference Final 3-0. Austin qualified for the last spot in the 2023 CONCACAF Champions League when the Philadelphia Union defeated defending MLS Champions NYCFC in the Eastern Conference Final.

Background 

Austin FC started their first season by building their roster with their first ever signing, Rodney Redes, on July 6, 2020. The club continued to build their squad by signing their first Designated Player, Cecilio Dominguez, on August 24, 2020. Austin FC continued to build on Dec 13, 2020 by trading for five more players using General Allocation Money. On Dec 15, 2020, the club obtained five more players through the 2021 MLS Expansion Draft. By the end of the year, Austin FC  added five more players to the roster. Austin FC started 2021 by adding seven more players to the team, including its second Designated Player, Tomás Pochettino. On April 16, 2021, the day before the clubs first competitive game they added two more players to round out the roster. On 30 June 2021, the club sign Moussa Djitté through the MLS U22 Initiative. Sebastián Driussi was signed on 29 July 2021 and the clubs third and final Designated Player. Austin FC completed its club roster on September 9, 2021 when they signed their first Homegrown Player, Owen Wolff, son of coach Josh Wolff.

2021 was the inaugural season for Austin FC, playing as an expansion club in Major League Soccer. The season started with an extended streak of away games while Q2 Stadium was being completed. Austin FC played its first eight games away from home, winning only two of those games. On June 19, 2021 Austin FC played its first game at Q2 Stadium, a draw against San Jose Earthquakes. Austin FC would go on to win seven home game during the season, finishing in 12th Place in the Western Conference and 24th place overall, with a record of 9 wins, 4 draws, and 21 loses.

Season

Pre-Season 
Immediately following the 2021 Austin FC season, Austin FC started their preparation for the 2022 MLS Season. After the retirement of Matt Besler on November 10, 2021, Austin FC started firming up their starting roster by completing the purchase of Žan Kolmanič from NK Maribor on November 19, 2021.  Following this signing they declined options on six players: Aedan Stanley, Aaron Schoenfeld, Brady Scott, Ben Sweat, Jared Stroud, Kekuta Manneh on November 30, 2021. Just over two weeks after declining his option, Austin FC re-signed Jared Stroud to a one year deal.

Austin FC took their first hit of the season during the 2021 MLS Expansion Draft when Charlotte FC chose McKinze Gaines in the first round for $50,000 GAM. This also exempted Austin FC from the 2022 MLS Expansion Draft.

On December 20, 2021, Austin FC strengthened their midfield be signing veteran free agent Ethan Finlay.

Upon signing with Austin FC on December 28, 2021, Maxi Urruti joined his sixth MLS team, including all three Texas based teams.

On January 10, 2022, Austin FC loaned Tomás Pochettino to Argentine club River Plate on a one year loan.

The MLS SuperDraft was held on January 11, 2022 and Austin FC selected Kipp Keller (GA) from Saint Louis University, Charlie Asensio from Clemson Tigers, and Michael Knapp from New York Red Bulls II.

On January 12, 2022, Austin FC signed midfielder Jhojan Valencia from Colombian Champions Deportivo Cali to a three year contract with an option for a fourth year.

Looking to continue strengthening the back four, Austin FC signed Norwegian defender Ruben Gabrielsen from French side Toulouse FC to a two year contract with an option for a third year.

Continuing to make adjustments to the lineup, Austin FC executed an offseason buyout of the last year of Ulises Segura's contract on January 25, 2022. That same day they also signed Damian Las, a U.S. Youth International, from Fulham FC.

Ensuring depth and experience, on February 7, 2021 Austin FC signed MLS Veteran Felipe Martins to the team as a free agent on a one-year contract with and option for a second year. Martins is a box-to-box midfielder who ranks among the best in the MLS during his 10 years in the league.

After Claudio Reyna announced that the team was looking at bringing on one more defender, possibly on loan, Austin FC signs Charlie Asensio to a one year deal with an option for three additional years. Asensio was the 35th overall draft pick from Clemson.

Start of the Season - February / March 
Austin FC opened their  season with consecutive home matches against Eastern Conference foes FC Cincinnati and Inter Miami CF and won 5-0 and 5-1 respectively, becoming the first MLS team in history to score 10 goals in their first 2 matches. Austin then lost their first road game in Portland 1-0 then had a 1-1 draw against the Sounders going into the first international break.

Rounding Into Form - April / May 
After starting the month with a disappointing 2-2 draw against the San Jose Earthquakes, Austin won their next 4 league matches. First, a 1-0 win against Minnesota United FC, and then a thrilling and historic 3-2 comeback win in Washington D.C. against D.C. United, with all 3 of their goals coming after the 80th minute, the 5th such occurrence in MLS history when a team won after trailing by 2+ goals after 80 minutes. Danny Hoesen scored his first goal for the club after recovering from a lengthy injury, and Ruben Gabrielsen followed with the game winner. They dismantled the Vancouver Whitecaps FC in a 3-0 home victory, and won 2-1 in Houston after losing goalkeeper Brad Stuver to injury. Sebastian Driussi was the first Austin FC player to be named the MLS Player of the Month and built an early case as an MVP favorite, with 4 goals and 1 assist in 5 matches.

On April 20, Austin FC also played their first ever Cup competition in the 2022 U.S. Open Cup Round of 32. Diego Fagundez scored the club's lone goal in a 2-1 loss against San Antonio FC in extra time.

After a blistering 4-1-0 April, Austin FC fell back to Earth in May, with a 1-1-3 record, including their first home loss of the season against the LA Galaxy on May 8. On May 13, the club announced that Josh Wolff had signed a three year contract extension through the 2025 MLS season. On May 18, Wolff's son Owen became the first homegrown player and youngest player to start a match for the club in a 2-1 win against LAFC. Austin went into the June international break with 7 wins, 3 draws, and 4 losses.

Road Warriors - June / July 
Austin FC came out of the international break with 7 matches over 29 days. They quickly got back to their winning ways with their first ever victory on foreign soil, a 1-0 victory over CF Montreal in Canada with only 10 men. They followed it up with a comeback 2-2 draw against FC Dallas then won their next four competitions - their first three on the road and their fourth a comeback home win against the Houston Dynamo to take the Copa Tejas lead. In their road win in Colorado, Driussi became the first player in club history to score 10 goals in a season and Austin FC exceeded their win and points total, and matched their goal total from 2021.

In their seventh match from the international break, Austin won their first trophy in franchise history when they played a 1-1 draw against FC Dallas in Toyota Stadium to claim the Copa Tejas on July 16. Fagundez scored the cup-winning goal in the 79th minute. Despite a Driussi brace a week later, Austin lost 4-3 at home to the New York Red Bulls and then closed out the month six days later with a 2-0 road win in Kansas City.

Austin FC made its first moves of the mid-year trade cycle by signing Washington Corozo (FW) on a 6-month loan, with option to buy, from the Ecuadorian team Sporting Cristal on July 6, and Emiliano Rigoni (FW) on July 29 from São Paulo FC. Rigoni and Driussi, both Argentines, were reunited after winning 5 trophies together with Zenit.

On July 12, Sebastian Driussi was named Austin's first MLS All-Star. He was named the MLS Player of the Month in July for the second time of the season with 5 goals and 3 assists in 6 games, bolstering his MVP candidacy.

On July 23, Cecilio Domínguez and Austin FC came to a mutual agreement for the termination of his contract, opening up a Designated Player spot on the roster, which went to Rigoni. He last played on March 20 and was suspended in April due to an MLS investigation related to an alleged instance of domestic violence. Despite being reinstated following MLS Protocols, the CBA and being required to attend League-mandated counseling, Dominguez did not make another appearance with the team.

End of the Regular Season - August / September / October 
On August 4, Austin FC announced it would expand the reach of their organization by becoming part of the Division 3 MLS Next Pro in 2023. According to Austin FC Sporting Director, Claudio Reyna, "The team will provide valuable competitive opportunities, and will play a key role in bridging the gap between the Austin FC Academy and First Team.". The team, colors, and crest were announced on December 13.

After winning in Kansas City, four of Austin's five competitions in August were at home, with the key match against LAFC on August 26 that would likely decide the top spot in the West, and possibly the Supporters' Shield. They had to settle for a 3-3 draw in their first match against the Earthquakes where they lost ground to LAFC, but Driussi scored another brace. They won their next match against Sporting KC 4-3, where Driussi scored the game winner after trailing 3-1 in the second half; Jon Gallagher, Julio Cascante and Danny Hoesen also scored goals. After losing 2-1 in Minnesota, Austin FC was 9 points behind LAFC going into their match against them, which they won 4-1 in coruscating fashion in front of a national audience. Maxi Urruti notched a brace with 2 goals over 3 minutes, and Diego Fagundez scored off a free kick. They ended August with a 2-1 home loss to Portland, but Driussi made a goal contribution in his 11th consecutive match scoring his 20th goal of the season, the first Austin FC player to do so. Going into September, Austin was 6 points behind LAFC and the Philadelphia Union for the Supporters Shield.

Austin had an opportunity to clinch their first playoff berth in team history on the road, but lost back-to-back 3-0 shutouts, all but ensuring they would not claim the Supporters' Shield. In the first match against Nashville SC, striker Hany Mukhtar made an MVP case of his own with a second half brace for Nashville and took over the Golden Boot lead from Driussi with his 20th and 21st goals of the season. Returning back home on September 14 against RSL, Moussa Djitte scored the club's first ever hat trick and Austin FC clinched their first ever MLS playoff berth in a 3-0 victory. They played Nashville three days later where Driussi and Mukhtar traded goals in a 1-1 draw and locked up the #2 seed in the West when FC Dallas lost to Colorado on October 1, ensuring their first two playoff games would be played at Q2. Their regular season ended with a loss and a draw in two October matches, and their final record was 16 wins, 8 draws, and 10 losses.

Postseason

Western Conference Quarterfinals vs. Real Salt Lake 
Austin FC's first ever playoff game was at Q2 Stadium against Real Salt Lake, who snuck into the playoffs after beating Portland 3-1 on Decision Day. The home crowd saw the club's first ever game that was decided by a penalty shootout. Austin found themselves down early when Sergio Córdova scored for RSL in the 3rd minute. He scored again on a penalty in the 15th minute after VAR ruled Jhojan Valencia played a handball in the box. Austin battled back when Sebastian Driussi scored a header the 31st minute from a Diego Fagundez cross. RSL was suddenly down a man when Rubio Rubin was sent off in the 53rd minute for failing to make a tackle on Austin GK Brad Stuver. RSL held firm defensively for the second half but Scott Caldwell played a handball, and Driussi scored a brace in the 4th minute of stoppage time to tie the game 2-2.

Austin dominated possession in the first half of extra time. Driussi had a goal in the 97th minute waved off when the referee ruled the ball ricocheted off his forearm on the volley. Žan Kolmanič took a shot from 30 yards out, but RSL GK Zac MacMath made the save in the 102nd minute. Emiliano Rigoni sent a header from Fagundez just wide of the post before the end the half.

Fagundez sent a corner in the 109th minute that Driussi headed off the post. In the 111th minute, RSL was on the counterattack but Stuver made a breakaway save on Andrew Brody. Driussi thought he had the game-winner in the 114th minute, but Moussa Djitte was offside. He had another header in the 120th minute that MacMath easily saved, and Felipe was later ruled offside on a Daniel Pereira cross. Austin tried to get one last chance before penalty kicks, but RSL ran out the clock as fatigue set in for both teams.

Austin won their first ever playoff game 3-1 on penalties with goals from Driussi, Fagundez, and Rigoni. Stuver made back-to-back saves then Tate Schmitt sent RSL's last chance over the bar in the 4th round.

Austin came back from two goals down for the 6th time of the season. They became the 3rd team in MLS history to win a playoff game after being down two goals.

Western Conference Semifinals vs. FC Dallas 
FC Dallas advanced to play Austin FC after beating Minnesota United in penalty kicks. Diego Fagundez nearly scored for Austin from a cross in the 2nd minute but the ball was cleared from the box. Moussa Djitte made his fourth start of the season and scored in the 26th minute from the center of the box following a corner. Sebastian Driussi became the first Austin FC player to score 30 career goals for the club when he doubled the lead in the 29th minute. He intercepted a pass at midfield and ran to the right side of the box and fired a shot to the bottom left post. FC Dallas keeper Maarten Paes saved Alexander Ring's attempt in the 37th minute. FC Dallas generated their first chance in stoppage time, but Austin FC took a 2-0 lead at half where both teams made substitutions. Alan Velasco finally broke through for FC Dallas in the 65th minute, and Paes kept the score 2-1 when he saved another shot from Fagundez a few minutes later. After going back and forth for over twenty minutes, Brad Stuver made a point-blank save on a Jáder Obrian header which Ring cleared, and Dallas wasn't able to generate any other scoring threats in stoppage time. Austin advanced to the Western Conference Final with a 2-1 victory.

Despite winning Copa Tejas three months earlier, this was Austin FC's first victory over FC Dallas.

Western Conference Final at LAFC 
LAFC advanced to the Western Conference Final on October 20 when MVP finalist Chicho Arango scored in the 93rd minute to give LAFC a 3-2 victory over their crosstown rival LA Galaxy. Arango opened the scoring off a corner in the 29th minute to cap off a dominant first half for LAFC and they weren't done. Maxi Urruti scored an own goal off a corner in the 62nd minute, and Kwadwo Opoku ended the scoring with a goal in the 81st minute. Austin FC lost 3-0 and their season came to an end.

Later that night, Austin FC qualified for the last spot in the 2023 CONCACAF Champions League when the Philadelphia Union defeated NYCFC in the Eastern Conference Final, their first time qualifying for a continental competition.

Management team

Roster

.

Transfers

In

Loan In

Out

Loan out

MLS SuperDraft picks

Non-competitive fixtures

Preseason

Midseason

Competitive fixtures

Major League Soccer Regular Season

Standings

Western Conference

Overall

Matches

MLS Playoffs

U.S. Open Cup 

In the club's first ever U.S. Open Cup appearance Austin FC suffered a "cupset" to San Antonio FC at Toyota Field, losing 2–1 in a game that had to extend into extra time to determine a winner.

Statistics

Appearances and goals

Numbers after plus–sign (+) denote appearances as a substitute.

Top scorers
{| class="wikitable" style="font-size: 95%; text-align: center;"
|-
!width=30|Rank
!width=30|Position
!width=30|Number
!width=175|Name
!width=75|
!width=75|
!width=75|
!width=75|Total
|-
|1
|FW
|7
|align="left"|
|22
|3
|0
|25
|-
|2
|FW
|37
|align="left"|
|9
|0
|0
|9
|-
|3
|MF
|14
|align="left"|
|6
|0
|1
|7
|-
|rowspan=2|4
|FW
|2
|align="left"|
|4
|1
|0
|5
|-
|FW
|13
|align="left"|
|5
|0
|0
|5
|-
|5
|MF
|8
|align="left"|
|4
|0
|0
|4
|-
|rowspan=2|7
|FW
|9
|align="left"|
|3
|0
|0
|3
|-
|DF
|18
|align="left"|
|3
|0
|0
|3
|-
|rowspan=3|9
|DF
|4
|align="left"|
|2
|0
|0
|2
|-
|MF
|6
|align="left"|
|2
|0
|0
|2
|-
|MF
|10
|align="left"|
|2
|0
|0
|2
|-
|rowspan=2|12
|DF
|17
|align="left"|
|1
|0
|0
|1
|-
|MF
|22
|align="left"|
|1
|0
|0
|1
|-
!colspan="4"|Total
! 65
! 4
! 1
! 70

Top assists
{| class="wikitable" style="font-size: 95%; text-align: center;"
|-
!width=30|Rank
!width=30|Position
!width=30|Number
!width=175|Name
!width=75|
!width=75|
!width=75|
!width=75|Total
|-
|1
|MF
|14
|align="left"| Diego Fagúndez
|15
|1
|0
|16
|-
|2
|FW
|7
|align="left"| Sebastián Driussi
|7
|0
|1
|8
|-
|3
|MF
|8
|align="left"| Alexander Ring
|7
|0
|0
|7
|-
|4
|FW
|13
|align="left"| Ethan Finlay
|6
|0
|0
|6
|-
|5
|RB
|24
|align="left"| Nick Lima
|5
|0
|0
|5
|-
|rowspan=2|6
|DF
|17
|align="left"| Jon Gallagher
|4
|0
|0
|4
|-
|DF
|18
|align="left"| Julio Cascante
|4
|0
|0
|4
|-
|rowspan="3"|8
|MF
|6
|align="left"| Daniel Pereira
|3
|0
|0
|3
|-
|DF
|16
|align="left"| Hector Jiménez
|3
|0
|0
|3
|-
|MF
|22
|align="left"| Felipe Martins
|3
|0
|0
|3
|-
|rowspan=4|11
|FW
|2
|align="left"| Moussa Djitté
|2
|0
|0
|2
|-
|DF
|4
|align="left"| Ruben Gabrielsen
|2
|0
|0
|2
|-
|LB
|23
|align="left"| Žan Kolmanič
|2
|0
|0
|2
|-
|FW
|37
|align="left"| Maximiliano Urruti
|2
|0
|0
|2
|-
|rowspan=4|15
|MF
|5
|align="left"| Jhojan Valencia
|1
|0
|0
|1
|-
|DF
|15
|align="left"| Kipp Keller
|1
|0
|0
|1
|-
|FW
|32
|align="left"| Washington Corozo
|1
|0
|0
|1
|-
|MF
|33
|align="left"| Owen Wolff
|1
|0
|0
|1
|-
!colspan="4"|Total
!67
!1
!1
!69

Disciplinary record
{| class="wikitable" style="text-align:center;"
|-
| rowspan="2" !width=15|
| rowspan="2" !width=15|
| rowspan="2" !width=120|Player
| colspan="3"|MLS
| colspan="3"|MLS Cup
| colspan="3"|U.S. Open Cup
| colspan="3"|Total
|-
!width=34; background:#fe9;|
!width=34; background:#fe9;|
!width=34; background:#ff8888;|
!width=34; background:#fe9;|
!width=34; background:#fe9;|
!width=34; background:#ff8888;|
!width=34; background:#fe9;|
!width=34; background:#fe9;|
!width=34; background:#ff8888;|
!width=34; background:#fe9;|
!width=34; background:#fe9;|
!width=34; background:#ff8888;|
|-
|1
|GK
|align="left"| Brad Stuver
|2||0||0||0||0||0||0||0||0||2||0||0
|-
|2
|FW
|align="left"| Moussa Djitté
|0||1||0||0||0||0||0||0||0||0||1||0
|-
|3
|CB
|align="left"| Jhohan Romaña
|1||0||0||0||0||0||0||0||0||1||0||0
|-
|4
|CB
|align="left"| Ruben Gabrielsen
|3||0||0||0||0||0||0||0||0||3||0||0
|-
|5
|MF
|align="left"| Jhojan Valencia
|5||0||0||0||0||0||0||0||0||5||0||0
|-
|6
|MF
|align="left"| Daniel Pereira
|8||1||1||0||0||0||0||0||0||8||1||1
|-
|7
|FW
|align="left"| Sebastián Driussi
|7||0||0||0||0||0||0||0||0||7||0||0
|-
|8
|MF
|align="left"| Alexander Ring
|7||0||0||1||0||0||0||0||0||8||0||0
|-
|10
|FW
|align="left"| Cecilio Domínguez
|1||0||0||0||0||0||0||0||0||1||0||0
|-
|11
|FW
|align="left"| Rodney Redes
|1||0||0||0||0||0||0||0||0||1||0||0
|-
|14
|MF
|align="left"| Diego Fagúndez
|4||0||0||0||0||0||0||0||0||4||0||0
|-
|15
|CB
|align="left"| Kipp Keller
|3||1||0||0||0||0||0||0||0||3||1||0
|-
|16
|DF
|align="left"| Hector Jiminez
|2||0||0||0||0||0||1||0||0||3||0||0
|-
|17
|DF
|align="left"| Jon Gallagher
|3||0||0||0||0||0||0||0||0||3||0||0
|-
|18
|CB
|align="left"| Julio Cascante
|6||0||0||1||0||0||0||0||0||7||0||0
|-
|22
|MF
|align="left"| Felipe Martins
|5||0||0||0||0||0||0||0||0||5||0||0
|-
|23
|LB
|align="left"| Žan Kolmanič
|2||0||0||0||0||0||1||0||0||3||0||0
|-
|24
|RB
|align="left"| Nick Lima
|3||0||0||1||0||0||0||0||0||4||0||0
|-
|33
|MF
|align="left"| Owen Wolff
|1||0||0||0||0||0||0||0||0||1||0||0
|-
|37
|FW
|align="left"| Maximiliano Urruti
|6||0||0||1||0||0||0||0||0||7||0||0
|-
|77
|FW
|align="left"| Emiliano Rigoni
|0||0||0||2||0||0||0||0||0||2||0||0
|-
|colspan="3"|Total||67||3||1||6||0||0||2||0||0||75||3||1

Awards and Honors

MLS Best XI

MLS All Star Team

End-of-season awards

MLS Player of the Month

MLS Player of the Week

MLS Team of the Week

MLS Goal of the Week

Notes

References 

 

2021
Austin Fc
Austin Fc
Austin Fc